Julien Vandierendounck (12 February 1921 – 1 August 2005) was a Belgian footballer. He played in one match for the Belgium national football team in 1950.

References

External links
 

1921 births
2005 deaths
Belgian footballers
Belgium international footballers
Place of birth missing
Association football midfielders